Assault shotgun may refer to:

Atchisson Assault Shotgun, a U.S. military weapon
 Assault shotgun, a shotgun that the law regards an assault weapon

See also
Armsel Striker
Automatic shotgun
Combat shotgun
Riot shotgun
Semi-automatic shotgun